Global Peace Initiative of Women (GPIW) is an international network of women and men spiritual and community leaders.

GPIW developed from the first World Summit of Women Religious and Spiritual Leaders at the Palais des Nations (United Nations) in Geneva in 2002.  GPIW places a special emphasis on building interfaith understanding and developing leadership in young community leaders worldwide. It is located in New York City.

A major focus of GPIW’s work in the last decade has been to nurture and assist young ecology leaders working on issues related to climate change and the ecological crisis. GPIW explores the root causes of the great imbalance humanity is experiencing by working on the "inner levels" and asking how we can reclaim our deepest living connection to Mother Earth and to one another. This work is under the stewardship of a small group of women who work with many others around the world to help manifest the special qualities of the sacred feminine, which enables the inner transformation needed for us to meet the challenges facing Earth’s community of life.

In 2011 GPIW held its first Inner Dimensions of Climate Change retreat in northern India. These  4–5 day intergenerational gatherings are held in various regions of the world in partnership with young ecological leaders and spiritual mentors from various backgrounds who are ready to investigate climate change from an ethical and spiritual perspective. Together, participants reflect on the inner shifts and changes that are needed to restructure the way humans are in relationship with the natural world. Since 2011, GPIW has invited and hosted approximately 500 young leaders to attend these retreats. Meetings have been held in Kashmir, Varanasi and Rishikesh, India, and in Morocco, Kenya, Cambodia, Japan, Costa Rica, Germany, Thailand, Cyprus, and the US.  

Dena Merriam is the founder and convener. The co-chair is Joan Chittister O.S.B., a Benedictine Sister and author.

The 2008 summit has taken place in Jaipur, India, from March 6–10. In March GPIW convened an environmental conference in Kenya to mobilize to protect the environment and promote sustainable development.

Notes

External links 
 http://www.gpiw.org Official Website of GPIW

Peace organizations based in the United States